Kikiki is a genus of fairyfly wasps containing a single species, Kikiki huna, known from Hawaii, Costa Rica, Nagarcoil and Trinidad. At  (150 μm), it is the smallest flying insect known . It is a close relative of wasps in the genus Tinkerbella. It was discovered in the Hawaiian Islands by John T. Huber and John W. Beardsley, and published in 2000. The name Kikiki huna consists of two Hawaiian words that both carry the meaning 'tiny bit'.

See also
 Dicopomorpha echmepterygis - The smallest known insect.
 Tinkerbella

References

Mymaridae
Monotypic Hymenoptera genera